Białowieża Forest is a forest on the border between Belarus and Poland. It is one of the last and largest remaining parts of the immense primeval forest that once stretched across the European Plain. The forest is home to 800 European bison, Europe's heaviest land animal. UNESCO's Man and the Biosphere Programme designated the Polish Biosphere Reserve  in 1976 and the Belarusian Biosphere Reserve  in 1993.

The forest has been designated a UNESCO World Heritage Site and an EU Natura 2000 Special Area of Conservation. The World Heritage Committee by its decision of June 2014 approved the extension of the UNESCO World Heritage site "Belovezhskaya Pushcha/Białowieża Forest, Belarus, Poland", which became "Białowieża Forest, Belarus, Poland".
Since the border between the two countries runs through the forest, there is a border crossing available for hikers and cyclists.

Name 

The Białowieża Forest takes its name from the Polish village of Białowieża, which is located in the middle of the forest and was probably one of the first human settlements in the area. Białowieża means "White Tower" in Polish. The name stems from the white wooden hunting-manor established in the village by Władysław II Jagiełło, the Grand Duke of Lithuania and later King of Poland who enjoyed going on hunting trips in the forest, which was then part of the Grand Duchy of Lithuania.

Nature protection

Białowieża National Park, Poland 

There is also the Białowieża Glade, with a complex of buildings once owned by the tsars of Russia during the Partitions of Poland. At present, a hotel and restaurant with a car park is located there. Guided tours into the strictly protected areas of the park can be arranged on foot, bike or by horse-drawn carriage. Approximately 120,000–150,000 tourists visit the Polish part of the forest annually (about 10,000 of them are from other countries). Among the attractions are birdwatching with local ornithologists, the chance to observe rare birds, pygmy owl observations, watching bison in their natural environment, and sledge as well as carriage rides, with a bonfire. Expert nature guides can also be found in the nearby urban centres. Tours are possible all year round. The popular village of Białowieża lies within the forest.  means "the white tower" in Old Polish.

Belavezhskaya Pushcha National Park, Belarus 

The core, strictly protected, area covers 38%, the zone of regulated use 26,1%, and the touristic zone and economic zone combined 36%; the National Park and World Heritage Site comprises . The  headquarters at Kamieniuki include laboratory facilities and a zoo where European bison (reintroduced into the park in 1929), konik (a semi-wild horse), wild boar, Eurasian elk and other indigenous animals may be viewed in enclosures of their natural habitat. A new attraction there is a New Year's museum with Ded Moroz (the East Slavic counterpart of Father Christmas).

History 

The entire area of northeastern Europe was originally covered by ancient woodland similar to that of the Białowieża Forest. Until about the 14th century, travel through the woodland was limited to river routes; roads and bridges appeared much later. Limited hunting rights were granted throughout the forest in the 14th century. In the 15th century the forest became a property of king Władysław II Jagiełło. A wooden manor in Białowieża became his refuge during a plague pandemic in 1426. The first recorded piece of legislation on the protection of the forest dates to 1538, when a document issued by Sigismund I instituted the death penalty for poaching a bison. The King also built a new wooden hunting manor in a village of Białowieża, which became the namesake for the whole complex. Since  means the "white tower", the corresponding  translates as the "forest of the white tower".

The forest was declared a hunting reserve in 1541 to protect bison. In 1557, the forest charter was issued, under which a special board was established to examine forest usage. In 1639, King Vladislaus IV issued the "Białowieża royal forest decree". They were also freed of taxes in exchange for taking care of the forest. The forest was divided into 12 triangular areas with a centre in Białowieża.

Until the reign of King John II Casimir, the forest was mostly unpopulated. However, in the late 17th century, several small villages were established for development of local iron-ore deposits and tar production. The villages were populated with settlers from Masovia and Podlaskie and many of them still exist.

After the Partitions of Poland, Tsar Paul I turned all the foresters into serfs and handed them over to various Russian aristocrats and generals along with the parts of forest where they lived. Also, a large number of hunters were able to enter the forest, as all protection was abolished. Following this, the number of bison fell from more than 500 to fewer than 200 in 15 years. However, in 1801, Tsar Alexander I reintroduced the reserve and hired a small number of peasants to protect the animals, and by the 1830s there were 700 bison. However, most of the foresters (500 out of 502) took part in the November Uprising of 1830–31, and their posts were abolished, leading to a breakdown of protection.

Tsar Alexander II visited the forest in 1860 and decided to re-establish the protection of bison. Following his orders, locals killed all predators: wolves, bears and lynx. Between 1888 and 1917, the Russian tsars owned all of primaeval forest, which became the royal hunting reserve. The tsars sent bison as gifts to various European capitals, while at the same time populating the forest with deer, elk and other animals imported from around the empire. 

The last Russian royalty visit was by Czar Nicholas II in 1912.

20th-century wartime damage and restoration 

During World War I the forest suffered heavy losses. The German army seized the area in August 1915 and started to hunt the animals. During three years of German occupation,  of railway tracks were laid in the forest to support the local industry. Three lumber mills were built, in Hajnówka, Białowieża and Gródek. Up to 25 September 1915, at least 200 bison were killed, and an order was issued forbidding hunting in the reserve. However, German soldiers, poachers and Soviet marauders continued the slaughter until February 1919 when the area was captured by the Polish army. The last bison had been killed just a month earlier. Thousands of deer and wild boar had also been shot.

After the Polish–Soviet War in 1921, the core of the forest was declared a National Reserve. In 1923, Professor Józef Paczoski, a pioneer of the science of phytosociology, became a scientific manager of the forest reserves in the Białowieża Forest. He carried out detailed studies of the structure of forest vegetation there.

In 1923 it was known that only 54 European bison survived in zoos all around the world, none of them in Poland. In 1929, a small herd of four was bought by the Polish state from various zoos and from the Western Caucasus (where the bison was to become extinct just a few years later).  These animals were of the slightly different Caucasian subspecies (Bison bonasus caucasicus). To protect them, in 1932 most of the forest was declared a national park. The reintroduction proved successful, and by 1939 there were 16 bison in Białowieża National Park. Two of them, from the zoo in Pszczyna, were descendants of a pair from the forest given to the Duke of Pszczyna by Tsar Alexander II in 1865.

In 1939 the local inhabitants of Polish ethnicity were deported to remote areas of the Soviet Union and replaced by Soviet forest workers. In 1941 the forest was occupied by Germans and the Russian Soviet inhabitants were also expelled. Hermann Göring planned to create the largest hunting reserve in the world there. After July 1941 the forest became a refuge for both Polish and Soviet partisans and Nazi authorities organised mass executions. A few graves of people who were killed by the Gestapo can still be seen in the forest. (Hermann Göring directed anti-partisan operations by Luftwaffe security battalions in the Białowieża Forest between 1942 and 1944 that resulted in the murder of thousands of Jews and Polish civilians.) In July 1944 the area was overtaken by the Red Army. Withdrawing Wehrmacht troops demolished the historic Białowieża hunting manor.

After the war, part of the forest was divided between Poland and the Belarusian SSR of the Soviet Union. The Soviet part was put under public administration while Poland reopened the Białowieża National Park in 1947.  was protected under Decision No. 657 of the Council of People's Commissars of the Soviet Union, 9 October 1944; Order No. 2252-P of the USSR Council of Ministers, 9 August 1957; and Decree No. 352 of the Byelorussian SSR Council of Ministers, 16 September 1991.

In December 1991, the Belavezha Accords, the decision to dissolve the Soviet Union, were signed at a meeting in the Belarusian part of the reserve by the leaders of Ukraine, Russia and Belarus.

Named oaks 

The forest contains a number of large, ancient pedunculate oaks (Quercus robur), some of which are individually named.

 Great Mamamuszi. Circumference  (2005), height . One of the thickest oaks in the forest, with a beautiful column-like trunk. The tree's name comes from Molière's The Bourgeois Gentleman, in which the main protagonist (Mr Jourdain) was appointed the Mamamouchi by a Turkish ambassador. Of all the oaks in Białowieża Forest with a circumference above , it is in the best condition.
 The King of Nieznanowo. Circumference , height . This tree has one of the most columnar trunks among the oaks in Białowieża Forest. The first branches arise at the height of 18 m. It has been gradually dying since 1998. , only two small branches still have leaves.
 Emperor of the South. Circumference , height . The tree shows no clear signs of dying.
 Emperor of the North. Circumference , height . The tree has a very regular trunk and shows no clear signs of dying.
 Southern Cross. Circumference , height . At the base of the trunk it has a considerable lesion in the bark on the eastern side. The name comes from the shape of its crown, whose main branches evoke a cross.
 The Guardian of Zwierzyniec. Circumference , height . This is one of the thickest oaks in the forest. The tree is largely bent down westwards, which most probably has contributed to the large circumference of the trunk at its base. All the branches are live, indicating that the tree is in good condition.
 Barrel Oak. This tree is named for its barrel-shaped trunk, and is the oak which reaches the greatest trunk circumference among the Białowieża oaks. The tree is dead and largely devoid of bark, and is estimated to be around 450 years old.
 Dominator Oak. One of the thickest oaks of the Białowieża, the tree has been dead since 1992 and its trunk is now largely devoid of bark. For many years it dominated the Białowieża Forest as far as size is concerned. Its age is estimated at 450 years.
 The Jagiełło Oak. Circumference (when growing) , height . It blew down in 1974, but is probably the most famous of the trees in the forest. It is said that King Władysław II Jagiełło rested beneath it before the Battle of Grunwald (Bitwa Pod Grunwaldem) in 1410, although the tree is believed to have been only 450 years old when it blew down.
 Tsar Oak (Polish) of Poland. Circumference , height . It died in 1984, and for over 20 years it has been standing dead on the edge of the valley of Leśna Prawa river. Today the trunk is totally devoid of bark and some of the branches have broken off and lie at the base of the trunk.
 Patriarch Oak. It stands  from the estate of Ded Moroz.

Logging 

Traditional forest management would remove the dead wood, as a fire risk. In 2011, Zdzisław Szkiruć, director of the Białowieża National Park, said that cutting and replanting allows for re-establishment of the forest in 50 years, rather than the 300–400 years that nature would require; environmentalist Janusz Korbel argued that the unique nature of the primeval forest demands a lighter style of management. Andrzej Kraszewski, Poland's Environment Minister from February 2010 to November 2011, sought to increase protection over the whole forest, starting with a more modest  expansion, against opposition from the local community and the Forestry Service.

Environmentalists say that logging is threatening the flora and fauna in the forest, including species of rare birds, such as the white-backed woodpecker, who lost 30% of their population in forestry-managed areas in the 1990s and 2000s. Poland's state forestry board claims the logging is for protection and for ecological reasons, protecting against the European spruce bark beetle.

Robert Cyglicki, head of Greenpeace Polska, argued that logging to fight the bark beetle would "bring more damage than benefits", gathering more than 120,000 signatures to petition Prime Minister Beata Szydło to reverse Szyszko's move. Greenpeace also said the logging could trigger the EU to launch punitive procedures against Poland for violating its Natura 2000 programme, though Szyszko claims that the logging plans would not apply to strictly protected areas, and claims that, rather than being 8,000 years old, as scientists claim, parts of the forest had been created by an "enterprising hand of man" on lands that centuries ago included fields of wheat and millet.

Large-scale logging started in 2017. 190,000 cubic metres of wood (160,000 to 180,000 trees) was felled, the largest volume of logging since 1988. The Polish government has ignored pleas from UNESCO to stop logging the old-growth parts of the forest, as well as a court order of the European Court of Justice to halt the logging activities. The final verdict fell on 17 April 2018, ruling that EU law has been infringed.

In popular culture 

 The forest is the subject of a Belarusian ballad , composed in 1975 by Aleksandra Pakhmutova, with lyrics by Nikolai Dobronravov, performed by Belarusian folk band Pesniary.
 Białowieża Forest is mentioned throughout Alan Weisman's book The World Without Us (2007), which investigates places that have been abandoned or left alone and imagines what they would be like if Earth's human population suddenly disappeared.
 British historian Simon Schama devotes several chapters of his book Landscape and Memory (1995) to the Białowieża Forest.
 In late 2017, Wojtek Voiteque Kowalik, a senior copy editor at the Polish advertising firm Ogilvy, decided to work with Greenpeace Poland to spread awareness of the Białowieża Forest and the logging threatening it. Kowalik decided to use the game Minecraft, as he wanted to capitalize on its playerbase of 87 million. Kowalik reasoned Minecraft was a form of social media, drawing parallels between the YouTube and Twitch communities dedicated to the game and the video arcades of his youth. Kowalik contacted Danish company GeoBoxers, who had previously recreated all of Denmark in Minecraft in 1:1 scale, and convinced them to do the same for Białowieża Forest. In return Ogilvy and Greenpeace provided reference material for Geoboxers in the form of a 3D topographical map of the  forest made from hundreds of images and maps of Białowieża Forest that took six weeks to complete.
 The action of a role-playing video game Werewolf: The Apocalypse – Heart of the Forest developed by Different Tales and released on October 13, 2020 (for MS Windows, Linux and Mac OS) takes place in Białowieża Forest. The player takes the role of Maia Boroditch, an American woman of Polish descent, who has recurring nightmares about a forest and wolves, and travels to Białowieża in Poland to learn about her family history and discovers secrets of the primeval Białowieża Forest.
 The forest is mentioned in Upton Sinclair's seminal novel The Jungle (1906). It is the birthplace of protagonist Jurgis Rudkus.

See also 

 Tourism in Poland
 List of national parks of Belarus
 List of national parks of Poland
 List of old-growth forests
 Perućica, a primeval forest in Europe (Bosnia and Herzegovina)
 Virgin Komi Forests, the largest forest in Europe
 Western Caucasus, the largest bison (wisent) habitat

Notes

References

External links 

 The UNESCO official site
 Białowieża National Park
 Oaks from Bialowieza 
 Trees of Białowieża National Park
 BBC radio documentary about the forest (2002)

 
Biosphere reserves of Belarus
Biosphere reserves of Poland
Forests of Belarus
Forests of Poland
Old-growth forests
National parks of Belarus
National parks of Poland
Geography of Brest Region
Geography of Grodno Region
Geography of Podlaskie Voivodeship
Transboundary protected areas
Natura 2000 in Poland
Parks in Podlaskie Voivodeship
Protected areas established in 1932
1932 establishments in Poland
Tourist attractions in Brest Region
World Heritage Sites in Belarus
World Heritage Sites in Poland
Central European mixed forests

da:Białowieska nationalpark